John Avery (February 29, 1824 – January 21, 1914) was a physician and politician from the U.S. state of Michigan. He served two terms in the United States House of Representatives from 1893 to 1897.

Early life and education
Avery was born in Watertown, New York and moved with his parents to Michigan in 1836. He attended the common schools and entered Grass Lake Academy in Jackson, where he studied medicine for two years.  He graduated from the Cleveland Medical College in 1850 and commenced the practice of medicine in Ionia, Michigan.  He then moved to Otsego, Michigan, in 1852 and continued the practice of his profession.

Civil War service
During the American Civil War, he was assistant surgeon and surgeon of the Twenty-first Regiment, Michigan Volunteer Infantry.  He served in the Army of the Cumberland in Kentucky and Tennessee and was with General William Tecumseh Sherman on his March to the Sea, as well as during the subsequent Carolinas Campaign.

Political career
He settled in Greenville, Michigan, in 1868 and again engaged in the practice of medicine.  He was a member of the Michigan State House of Representatives in 1869 and 1870.  He was appointed a member of the State Board of Health in 1880 and was reappointed in 1886.

Avery was elected as a Republican to the United States House of Representatives for the Fifty-third and Fifty-fourth Congresses, serving from March 4, 1893 to March 3, 1897. He was not a candidate for renomination in 1896.

After leaving Congress, Avery went back to Greenville and returned to the practice of medicine.  He died at the age of eighty-nine and was interred at Forest Home Cemetery of Greenville.

References 

 The Political Graveyard

External links 
 21st Michigan Volunteer Infantry Page on Avery

1824 births
1914 deaths
Union Army surgeons
Burials in Michigan
19th-century American physicians
Republican Party members of the Michigan House of Representatives
Politicians from Watertown, New York
People of Michigan in the American Civil War
Physicians from Michigan
Physicians from New York (state)
Republican Party members of the United States House of Representatives from Michigan
19th-century American politicians
People from Otsego, Michigan
People from Greenville, Michigan
People from Ionia, Michigan